Ardo Ojasalu (born 21 September 1964 Tallinn) is an Estonian computer engineer and politician. He was a member of VII Riigikogu.

References

Living people
1964 births
Members of the Riigikogu, 1992–1995
Social Democratic Party (Estonia) politicians
Tallinn University of Technology alumni
Politicians from Tallinn